Pilz GmbH & Co. KG is a German automation technology company in Ostfildern, Germany. In addition to the head office in Germany, Pilz is represented in 42 subsidiaries and branches on all continents.

The company was founded as a glass-blowing business by Hermann Pilz in Esslingen in 1948. Initial products included glass apparatus for medical technology and mercury relays for industrial applications.

In the 1960s control passed to Hermann's son Peter, who developed the company into a supplier of electronic control and monitoring devices and programmable logic controllers. In 1987 the company launched safety relay PNOZ, an emergency stop system. PSS control systems were developed in the 1990s. Other Pilz products and services include sensor technology, bus and industrial wireless systems, risk assessments and training courses on machinery safety.

References

External links 
 Official website

Electronics companies of Germany
Electronics companies established in 1948
1948 establishments in Germany